Hazelwood West High School is a public high school in the Hazelwood School District located in North St. Louis County, Missouri, United States.

History 
Hazelwood West High School began in 1974, with the first graduating class in 1975. Due to overcrowding of Hazelwood Senior High School (now known as Hazelwood Central), students attended classes on split shift in afternoons. The building that would partially become Hazelwood West opened in 1969 as a junior high school, Howdershell Jr. High. A greatly expanded building opened as a six-year facility in the fall of 1976, the present Hazelwood West High School, housing students from grades nine through twelve. In 2002, all district junior high schools were renamed middle schools. In 2005, two new building additions were added, a band room near the main entrance and a three-story classroom wing in the rear of the former middle school section. With the completion of six new middle schools in 2007: Hazelwood Central Middle School, Hazelwood North Middle School, Hazelwood Northwest Middle School, Hazelwood East Middle School, Hazelwood Southeast Middle School, and Hazelwood West Middle School, Hazelwood West was designated solely as a high school.

Notable alumni
Lamark Brown '07, NFL Player
Morgan Burkhart '90, Major League Baseball player
Trevor Gaylor '96, NFL player
Kyle McClellan '02, Major League Baseball player
Al Nipper '77, Major League Baseball player
Pat O'Connor '78, member, Missouri House of Representatives
David Phelps '05, Major League Baseball player
Rob Riti '95, All-American football player
Devin Williams '13, Major League Baseball player
Matt Winer '87, journalist for ESPN
Jeffrey Wittmer '03, US weightlifter
Clint Zweifel '91, State Treasurer of Missouri

References

External links 
 Hazelwood West High School Webpage
 Statistical data about Hazelwood West from the Missouri Dept. of Elementary and Secondary Education 
 Hazelwood School District homepage

High schools in St. Louis County, Missouri
School buildings completed in 1969
Educational institutions established in 1975
Public high schools in Missouri